The 2022 United States Senate election in Indiana was held on November 8, 2022 to elect a member of the United States Senate to represent the state of Indiana. Incumbent Republican Senator Todd Young was reelected to a second term.

Young announced on March 2, 2021, that he would be running for a second term. Young was first elected to the Senate in 2016 with 52.1% of the vote, succeeding retiring U.S. Senator Dan Coats. Hammond Mayor Thomas McDermott Jr. ran for the Democratic nomination. Both ran unopposed and won their respective primaries on May 3, 2022.

Republican primary

Candidates

Nominee 
Todd Young, incumbent U.S. Senator

Removed from ballot

Results

Democratic primary

Candidates

Nominee

Removed from ballot
Haneefah Khaaliq, professor at Indiana University (ran as independent)
Valerie McCray, psychologist

On February 18, 2022, the Indiana Election Commission removed Democratic candidates Haneefah Khaaliq and Valerie McCray, as well as Republican candidate Danny Niederberger, from the primary ballot. On February 4, 2022, McDermott campaign adviser Kevin Smith said the campaign would look closely at whether Khaaliq and McCray met the ballot requirements and that avoiding a primary challenge could benefit McDermott as he entered this year with about $50,000 in campaign cash. Khaaliq then conducted an investigation and discovered that the individual who filed the challenge against both her and McCray was Scott Yahne, an attorney who was a close friend and ally of McDermott.

As a result of the investigation findings, Khaaliq filed a lawsuit against the Indiana Election Commission and announced her decision to proceed as a write-in candidate in the 2022 general election. Khaaliq was the first African American to run for the U.S. Senate in a general election in Indiana's history.

Declined
Joe Hogsett, Mayor of Indianapolis, former Indiana Secretary of State, former U.S. Attorney for the Southern District of Indiana, former chair of the Indiana Democratic Party, and nominee for U.S. Senate in 1992
Pete Buttigieg, U.S. Secretary of Transportation, former Mayor of South Bend, nominee for Indiana State Treasurer in 2010, and candidate for President of the United States in 2020
Joe Donnelly, U.S. Ambassador to the Holy See and former U.S. Senator
J. D. Ford, state senator (ran for re-election)

Results

Libertarian convention

Candidates

Nominee
 James Sceniak, activist and behavior therapist

Eliminated at convention
 William Henry, U.S. Army veteran

Write-ins

Candidates

Declared
Haneefah Khaaliq, professor at Indiana University
Thomas Baer
Phillip Beachy
David G. Storer
Danny Niederberger
Antonio Xavier Alvarez

Withdrew/Disqualified 
 Ellen Kizik, retail worker

General election

Predictions

Endorsements

Polling

Results

See also 
 2022 United States Senate elections
 2022 Indiana elections

Notes

Partisan clients

References

External links 
Official campaign websites
 Haneefah Khaaliq (I) for Senate
 Thomas McDermott Jr. (D) for Senate
 James Sceniak (L) for Senate
 Todd Young (R) for Senate

2022
Indiana
United States Senate